The Redonda Lagoon (Spanish: Laguna Redonda) is a lagoon located in the city of Concepción, Chile. It covers a surface of  m² and contains the deepest lagoon of all the city, with a depth of 19 m.

Geography 

History 
At the beginning of the 20th century, the lagoon was the halfway between Concepción and Talcahuano. It was part of the tram that worked between 1908 and 1941. In that period, the lagoon was surrounded by golf courses of the British colony, and by several fundos and quintas that provided to the local industry raw materials.

Today, it is located in Lorenzo Arenas, a sector in the city of Concepción.

See also 

 Laguna de Aculeo
 Laguna Carén

References 

Concepción, Chile
Lagoons of Chile